Loki Emmanuel (born 14 November 2001) is a South Sudanese professional footballer who plays as a forward for Uganda Premier League club Bright Stars and the South Sudan national team.

Club career
In October 2020 Emmanuel signed for Bright Stars of the Uganda Premier League on a 3-year contract.

International career
Emmanuel made two appearances for South Sudan in the 2019 CECAFA U-20 Championship. He made his senior international debut on 6 October 2021 in a friendly against Sierra Leone. He scored his first international goal in the match, an eventual 1–1 draw.

International goals
Scores and results list South Sudan's goal tally first.

International career statistics

References

External links
 

2001 births
Living people
Association football forwards
Canadian sportspeople of African descent
Sportspeople of South Sudanese descent
South Sudanese footballers
South Sudanese expatriate footballers
South Sudan international footballers